Comics in the Philippines have been widespread and popular throughout the country from the 1920s to the present. Komiks were partially inspired by American mainstream comic strips and comic books during the early 20th century. The medium first became widely popular after World War II. Its mainstream appeal subsided somewhat during the latter part of the 20th century with the advent of other mass-media forms such as telenovelas, but experienced a renaissance in the mid-2010s with the increasing popularity of artists such as Gerry Alanguilan, Arnold Arre, Budjette Tan, Kajo Baldisimo, and the rise of fan communities through comic book conventions such as komikon. Webcomics produced by independent Filipino web-based artists have caught the attention of local and foreign readers.

The word komiks is simply the English word "comics," adapted to fit the orthography of native Filipino languages such as Tagalog.

History

Origins 

While the first indigenous cartoons may be traced to José Rizal's illustration of the fable "The Tortoise and the Monkey" (1885), the origins of the mainstream komiks industry would not arise until after the Spanish–American War. Rizal's illustration did not incorporate the use of speech balloons; instead, the characters' conversation were written under the panels.

In the 1920s, Liwayway magazine began running comic strips under the direction of Romualdo Ramos and Tony Velasquez, such as the still-running Mga Kabalbalan ni Kenkoy (The Misadventures of Kenkoy).  Velasquez is considered the father of Filipino comics.

Golden Age 
During the World War II, American GIs brought comic books with them for entertainment. After the war, Filipino publishers began publishing material in the serialized comic book format.

Mars Ravelo created a number of Filipino superheroes, several of which had been adapted to multiple films and television series. His characters like Darna and Captain Barbell became sources of escapism and hope post-war. Ravelo also created Bondying and like Kenkoy, the word "bondying" has entered the Filipino language.

Pablo S. Gomez wrote for Pilipino Komiks and Tagalog Klasiks before founding PSG in 1963. Most of his works were adapted into films and television series, some of which are Inday Bote, Machete and Bunsong Kerubin.

Evolution 
Originally inspired by American comic strips and comic books left behind by American GIs, the medium steadily diverged, and by the 1950s, drew more inspiration from other forms of Filipino literature such as komedya, as well as Philippine mythology. Many komiks were evidently inspired by specific American comics, such as Kulafu and Og (Tarzan), Darna (Captain Marvel and Wonder Woman), and D. I. Trece (Dick Tracy). The predominance of superheroes has continued into the modern day. However, other characters such as Dyesebel draw more from traditional folklore.

Breaking into the American comics scene 
Filipino artists broke into the American comics industry in the 1970s, drawing for such companies as DC Comics, Marvel Comics, Pendulum Press, and Warren Publishing. The Filipino artists worked mostly on fantasy, horror, and Western titles, most actively in the period 1970– 1985.

Tony DeZuniga was the first Filipino comic book artist whose work was accepted by American publishers, paving the way for many others. Beginning in 1970, DeZuniga became a regular contributor to DC Comics' horror and Western titles. In 1971, DC editor Joe Orlando (who had first hired DeZuniga) and DC publisher Carmine Infantino traveled to the Philippines on a recruiting trip. Alfredo Alcala, Mar Amongo, Ernie Chan, Alex Niño, Nestor Redondo, and Gerry Talaoc were some of the Filipino komiks artists who went on to work for DC.

A similar trip to the Philippines by Pendulum Press editor Vincent Fago in 1970 led to a great number of Filipino artists working on the Pendulum Illustrated Classics series, which were black-and-white comic book adaptations of literary classics. Fago teamed with Nestor Redondo to recruit Filipino artists for Pendulum. In addition to the work of Redondo, who illustrated more than 20 books in the series, the Pendulum Illustrated Classics featured the artwork of Niño, Talaoc, Vicatan, Rudy Nebres, Jun Lofamia, Nestor Leonidez, and E. R. Cruz. (Redondo's brothers Virgilio and Frank also illustrated books in the series.)

At Marvel Comics, Steve Gan became highly regarded for his artwork on both Conan titles Conan the Barbarian and Savage Sword of Conan from 1974 to 1979. From 1975 to 1979, Tony DeZuniga organized a group of New York-based Filipino komiks artists who inked various Marvel comics under the collective pseudonym of "The Tribe." Members of the Tribe included DeZuniga, Alcala, Nebres, and Chuck Nanco. In 1977–1978, the group of creators — which now included non-Filipino artists like Ken Landgraf, Andre Gordon, and Ed Monji — became officially known as Action Art Studio, an operation co-owned and managed by DeZuniga and his wife Mary. Titles worked on by the group in 1975–1979 included Marvel Classics Comics, Conan, Ghost Rider, Master of Kung Fu, Nova, Sons of the Tiger, and Tarzan, as well as various specials and one-shots.

Beginning in 1978 and lasting until about 1983, the black-and-white comics magazine publisher Warren Publishing also utilized the talents of a number of Filipino artists, including Niño, Nebres, and Alcala.

From the mid-1980s on, fewer Filipino artists found work in the American comics industry, the exceptions being DeZuniga (co-creator of Jonah Hex), Chan, Alcala (who drew and inked for Swamp Thing and He-Man and who had the distinction of having his original comics, Voltar, published internationally), and Talaoc.

Popularity 
At one point, between 33 and 40 percent of Filipinos read komiks, but this number has since dwindled somewhat due to competition from other media forms.  More recently, comic artists have begun producing what is often called "Pinoy Manga," inspired largely by Japanese anime and manga, which have been widely available in the Philippines since the 1970s.

PhilPost released a series of national stamps based on komiks on November 15, 2004. Among those featured were Gilbert Monsanto's Mango Comics Darna #3, Nestor Redondo's Darna, Francisco Reyes' Kulafu, Francisco V. Coching's Lapu-Lapu, and Federico Javinal and Coching's El Vibora.

Modern Age 
Characters and stories by Coching, Ravelo and Gomez are still being adapted into films and television series.

See also 

 List of Filipino komik artists
 List of Filipino comics creators
 List of Filipino komiks
 List of Filipino superheroes
 List of Filipino supervillains

References

Citations

Sources 
 The Philippine Comics Art Museum
 Celebrating 120 Years of Komiks From the Philippines I: The History of Komiks, Newsarama, October 19, 2006
 Celebrating 120 Years of Komiks From the Philippines II: The Future of Komiks, Newsarama, October 21, 2006
 Lent, John A. (2009) The First One Hundred Years of Philippine Komiks and Cartoons. Boboy Yonzon.
 Roxas, Cynthia and Joaquin Arevalo, Jr. A History of komiks of the Philippines and other countries, with contributions by Soledad S. Reyes, Karina Constantino-David, Efren Abueg; edited by Ramon R. Marcelino

External links 
 Original comic fable "The Monkey and the Tortoise" illustrated by Dr. José Rizal
 "Kenkoy kick-started komiks" article
 "Philippine Comics" The most comprehensive library of Filipino comics on the internet.

 
Comic strips
Philippine comics titles

Comics titles by country
Titles
Philippines
Comic strips by country